is a passenger railway station located in the town of Ina, Saitama, Japan, operated by the Saitama New Urban Transit Company.

Lines 

Station layout
This elevated station consists of a single island platform serving two tracks, west of the Jōetsu Shinkansen tracks.

Platforms

History
The station opened on 22 August 1990.

Passenger statistics
In fiscal 2017, the station was used by an average of 4,780 passengers daily (boarding passengers only).

Surrounding area
Choseiseko Memorial Park
Kobarikita Elementary School

See also
List of railway stations in Japan

References

External links

 Station information 

Railway stations in Japan opened in 1990
Railway stations in Saitama Prefecture
Ina, Saitama